Pasolini is a 2014 English-language internationally co-produced drama film directed by Abel Ferrara and written by Maurizio Braucci about the final days of Italian film director Pier Paolo Pasolini (played by Willem Dafoe). It was selected to compete for the Golden Lion at the 71st Venice International Film Festival. It was also screened in the Special Presentations section of the 2014 Toronto International Film Festival.

Plot
Pier Paolo Pasolini (Willem Dafoe) is fifty-three, and lives in the rowdy Rome of the 1970s. He has just finished shooting his latest film Salò, or the 120 Days of Sodom, a film that has shocked both critics and audiences. Pasolini is increasingly opposed by the people, critics and politicians, both for his homosexuality, and because he is considered impulsive and scandalous in showing his reality to the public. Pasolini is going to shoot a new film (which was never made), in which he cast Eduardo De Filippo (Ninetto Davoli) and Ninetto Davoli (Riccardo Scamarcio) - with whom he has a special relationship. While Pasolini is working on the film, his mother (Adriana Asti) and his cousin try to dissuade him from the project, because it would be too wild and visionary for the Italian public to accept.

Pasolini continues with his work, missing many interviews with journalists. He begins a relationship with a boy from the suburbs of Rome, Pino Pelosi, and takes him to a restaurant in the seaside village of Ostia. Pasolini wants to be with him in a loving relationship, but the boy gets mad at him, attacking him and some other companions. Pasolini is later beaten up and then run over with his own car. In the days following, the press says Pasolini's murder was politically motivated by the police and those whom the poet had always loved and immortalized in his works.

Cast
 Willem Dafoe as Pier Paolo Pasolini 
 Ninetto Davoli as Eduardo De Filippo
 Riccardo Scamarcio as Ninetto Davoli
 Valerio Mastandrea as Domenico "Nico" Naldini
 Adriana Asti as Susanna Colussi Pasolini
 Giada Colagrande as Graziella Chiarcossi
 Salvatore Ruocco as Socialist politician
 Maria de Medeiros as Laura Betti
 Francesco Siciliano as Furio Colombo
 Luca Lionello as narrator

Production
According to Ferrara, his plans to make a film about Pasolini have gone far back as the 1990s. Originally, the project was not meant to have been an actual biopic of Pasolini's life.  Instead, it was to have starred Zoë Tamerlis Lund as "a female director living the life that Pasolini lived." However, Lund's death prevented this idea.

Reception
On the review aggregation website Rotten Tomatoes, the film has a 78% approval rating, based on 55 reviews, with a weighted average of 6.8/10. The website's consensus reads, "Pasolini may frustrate viewers seeking a straightforward biopic, but director Abel Ferrara's unconventional approach is well-matched by Willem Dafoe's performance." On Metacritic, the film has a score of 71 out of 100, based on 18 critics.

References

External links
 
 
 
 

2014 films
2014 drama films
2014 biographical drama films
2014 LGBT-related films
2010s English-language films
English-language Belgian films
English-language French films
English-language Italian films
2010s Italian-language films
2010s French-language films
Belgian multilingual films
Belgian biographical drama films
Belgian LGBT-related films
French multilingual films
French biographical drama films
French LGBT-related films
Italian biographical drama films
Italian LGBT-related films
Italian multilingual films
Films about film directors and producers
Films directed by Abel Ferrara
Films shot in Italy
Cultural depictions of Italian men
Pier Paolo Pasolini
French-language Belgian films
2010s French films